Vangueria chariensis is a species of flowering plant in the family Rubiaceae. It is endemic to southeastern Chad. It is named after the Chari river.

References

External links 
 World Checklist of Rubiaceae

Endemic flora of Chad
chariensis